Cirrhimuraena cheilopogon is an eel in the family Ophichthidae (worm/snake eels). It was described by Pieter Bleeker in 1860. It is a tropical, marine eel which is known from Papua New Guinea, in the western central Pacific Ocean.

References

Ophichthidae
Fish described in 1860